Damaji Thorat was a chief of Maratha Empire. He had support from  Ramchandra Pant.
Rajaram I sent Thorat, Pawar and Athavle to make their established collections the chauth and sardeshmukhi, as they were termed, from the Mughal territory, and under the encouragement of success his officers added a third contribution for themselves under the head of ghasdana or forage money. In this manner a new army was raised whose leaders were Thorat, Pawar and Athavale. Rajaram I gave them honorary presents and rewards; the title of Vishwasrao was conferred on Pawar, of Dinkarrao on Thorat and of Shamsher Bahadur on Athavle.

Rustumrao
Damaji Thorat lived at Hingangao near Purandar.His family also has patilki of hingangao village He had built a strong fortress there.He was from Hatkar-Dhangar caste. Thorat came to power during the reign of Rajaram. Ramchandra Pant granted him Patas kasba as Jahagir. After Rajaram's death, he showed great bravery against the Mughals. For his bravery he was given the title 'Rustumrao'.

After Rajaram's Death 
When Shahu arrived in the Swarajya territory he tried to win Thorat to his side but Thorat did not join Shahu. In 1708 Dhanaji Jadhav went to Khandesh. He brought Thorat and Dabhade with him to meet Shahu. In July 1709 meeting between Shahu, Sambhaji and Damaji Thorat and others proved unsuccessful. In July 1711 Chandrasen revolted against Shahu. Thorat also joined Tarabai. Tarabai welcomed with joy their move. When Angre was very aggressive against Shahu, Thorat brothers created considerable trouble for Shahu in the territory around Poona. After the deposition of Tarabai and her son, Damaji Thorat became the supporter of Sambhaji and sought Nizam’s protection, Damaji Thorat also went over to Nizam’s side and afterwards to Husain Ali. In 1716 Damaji was very active against Shahu. In one letter written by Balaji Vishwanath to Shahu it was stated, that Thorat brothers had created much trouble in the territory around Miraj. In fact when Balaji had concluded treaty with Angre he had assured that he would not take any step against Damaji. However, as they had created a lot of trouble for Shahu with the support of Sambhaji of Kolhapur conflict between the two sides became inevitable.

Clash with Balaji Vishwanath Bhat
Balaji Vishwanath Bhat introduced gradually some strength into his councils, and started to take lead in public affairs. Balaji proposed to reduce Damaji Thorat in 1711, and then set out with an army for that purpose. Balaji was seized and thrown into the confinement with Dewaan Ambaji Purandhare, his two young sons Baji Rao I (11 years old) and Chimnaji Appa, and many of their immediate officers.

Clash with Sachiv
Shahu who now applied to the Sachiv to suppress Thorat. The Sachiv and his manager advanced against Thorat, but they too were defeated and thrown into confinement. Damaji Thorat had seized the young Sachiv, and an expedition was again planned against him. Balaji managed first to effect the Sachiv's release and in return received the Sachiv's rights in the Poona district and the fort of Purandhar, and Damaji was soon defeated and taken prisoner.

References

1. W. W. Loch, Dakhan History Musalman and Maratha.
2. G. S. Chhabra, Advanced study in History of Modern India, Volume 1, 2005
3. Wolseley Haig, The Cambridge History of India, Volume 3
4. James Grant Duff, A History of the Marattas, Volume 1, 1826
5. https://gazetteers.maharashtra.gov.in/cultural.maharashtra.gov.in/english/gazetteer/Satara%20District/histroy_musalmans.html#4
6. Chapter 3:- Sambhaji-Shahu relations up to 1730.

People of the Maratha Empire